Zelleria abisella is a moth of the  family Yponomeutidae. It is found in France.

References

Moths described in 1910
Yponomeutidae
Moths of Europe